This is a list of radio stations that broadcast on FM frequency 102.2 MHz:

China 
 CNR The Voice of China in Changzhou and Jiangmen

Indonesia 
 Prambors Radio in Jakarta
 Persada FM in Sragen Regency, Central Java, Indonesia

Republic of Ireland 
 Dublin's Q102 in Dublin
 West Limerick 102 in Newcastle West

Turkey 

 TRT Radyo Haber at Gaziantep

United Kingdom 

  in Birmingham, West Midlands
  in Workington
  in Penicuik
  in Wiltshire
  in the Shetland Islands
  in London
  in north & east Cornwall.
  in Lincoln and Newark-on-Trent
  in Ullapool

Lists of radio stations by frequency